Radio Nova was a pirate radio station broadcasting from Dublin, Ireland. Owned and operated by the UK pirate radio veteran Chris Cary, the station's first broadcasts were during the summer of 1981 on 88.5 MHz FM and 819 kHz AM.

Early history
Prior to Nova's arrival, Irish radio consisted of the government broadcaster RTÉ and a number of local AM pirate stations. Radio Nova was the first station in Ireland to use a high powered signal on FM. By 1982 Radio Nova was pulling in over 40% of the available audience around Dublin. In September 1982 Radio Nova (operating on 88.1FM and 819AM at the time) introduced a new service called Kiss FM on 102.7 MHz - inspired by Los Angeles-based 102.7 KIIS-FM.

Prior to May 1983 the stations had been allowed to operate without interference from the Irish government. However, on 18 May 1983 officials from the Department of Posts and Telegraphs together with Irish Gardaí raided both the studio site and the transmitter sites of Radio Nova and Kiss FM. Both stations went off air until the next day. Following the raids, the Minister for Communications claimed in the Dáil (25 May 1983) that intermodulation products resulting from co-located transmitters for Radio Nova and its sister station Kiss FM had caused interference to emergency services' frequencies around 74 MHz for a period in the previous month.

On 19 May at 6.00am, Radio Nova returned to the air to announce that they would be closing down at 6.00pm that day. They urged listeners to protest to the government and to show up at the Nova studios in Herbert Street, Dublin 2 for a huge protest. The story was front page of every national newspaper and was headline news on RTÉ. The hysteria continued when a rival pirate Sunshine Radio was raided at 9.00am. By 6.00pm, there were several thousand people outside the studios of Nova as the station played its last record.

The political fallout of the Nova closedown was huge. More protest marches continued and following criticism of the government's action by the judge in the State's case against Nova, the station returned in glory some days later.

During the winter months of 1983 Radio Nova started test transmissions on UHF TV. The station was to be "Nova TV" and was to run a similar format to MTV in the United States. Tests stopped after the government raided the studios and warned they would not tolerate a pirate television station operating.

More trouble was to hit Radio Nova in 1984. The state broadcaster RTÉ which had seen its audience dwindle due to the arrival of Nova and other large pirate stations started a jamming campaign against Radio Nova. The jamming continued for some weeks and made reception of Nova almost impossible at times. The station eventually went into receivership and shut down its Kiss FM operation. Eventually the Irish government ordered RTÉ to stop the jamming and once again Radio Nova flourished.

NUJ Dispute May 1984

By the middle of 1985 the radio dial in Dublin was getting very crowded. Although the station remained firmly at number one (some survey books during this time show Nova at 62% reach in Dublin) they faced increasing competition from RTÉ and other pirates like Sunshine Radio. There was now also Q102, a station founded by former Radio Nova DJ Lawrence John, after being pressured not to cross the NUJ picket line at Radio Nova. To try to increase revenue, Radio Nova launched a new station called Magic 103.  Magic 103 was an easy listening station with a lot of local news and current affairs designed to appeal to the Irish government who were taking part in a national debate about local radio. Magic 103 was not a success, however, and was shut down by Chris Cary at very short notice. This infuriated the National Union of Journalists who called a strike and placed pickets on Radio Nova. They also urged advertising agencies to boycott the station. With advertising revenue down dramatically and trouble in the boardroom, Cary pulled the plug on Radio Nova with just three hours’ notice on 19 March 1986.

Nova after closure

Subsequently, another station began broadcasting using most of Nova's old equipment and frequencies under the cover name of Zoom 103, later rebranded as ENeRGy 103, NRG 103 stood for "Nova re-generated". However, despite various name-changes (Energy Power 103 FM, a "merger" with a Radio Nova (The Hot 100 FM), then a re-launch station called Nova Power 103 FM, and once again reverting to the "Energy Power 103 FM" name) this station never enjoyed the same success as its predecessor and was eventually bought out and shut down on 11 March 1988 by rival station Q102. Within two weeks Q relaunched themselves as SuperQ102 on NRG's four FM frequencies ranging from 99.9 to 103.1 MHz which effectively "boxed in" Sunshine 101.

Chris Cary subsequently launched a satellite radio station, also called Radio Nova, from a studio in the United Kingdom.

Nova Presenters and Airstaff 
 Andy Archer
 Mike Edgar (news and disc jockey (DJ))
 Colm Hayes - Former FM104 and 2FM DJ and now PD for Classic Hits.
 Casey Casem (not to be confused with Casey Kasem)
 Rick Dees
 Terry Riley
 Chris Cary aka "Harry"
 Sybil Fennell
 Gary Hamill (news and disc jockey (DJ))
 John Clarke - Former 2FM DJ and producer and boss, now with Radio Nova 100FM (Ireland).
 Jason Maine
 Bryan Dobson (news) - now presenter of Six One News on RTÉ One
 Anna Cassin (news) - now presenter of Nationwide on RTÉ One
 Ken Hammond (news) - now an RTÉ Newscaster
 David Harvey
 Emperor Rosko
 Tom Hardy - former PD for Today FM and now a radio consultant
 Declan Meehan (radio presenter) - already had much pirate radio experience and had left 2FM and rejoined pirate scene before joining Radio Nova, now a DJ with East Coast FM.
 Hugh O'Brien
 Tony Allan
 Denis Murray
 Tony Gareth aka Gareth O'Callaghan - former RTÉ DJ, now on 4FM
 Bernie Jameson
 Tony Mackenzie
 Andrew Hanlon aka Dave Johnson - now TV3
 John O'Hara
 Jim Cotter
 Greg Gaughran now with Radio Nova 100FM (Ireland).
 George Talbot (Drivetime)
 Lawrence John (ALL NIGHT NOVA, 1983 & 1984) founded Q102, Dublin in 1985 and ENERGY 106, Belfast 1997. Later produced and hosted a series of weekly TV shows on Virgin TV and SKY. Now owns Jump Radio Belfast and Radio Nova International, an online tribute station www.RadioNOVAinternational.co 
 Chris Barry - late night talk show host FM104
 Scott Williams - now CEO (and presenter) with Dublin's Q102.
 Aidan Cooney - Had been with a number of pirates before Radio Nova and a few afterwards. Now works on TV3 (Ireland) and Dublin's Q102.
 Frank Wynne
 Roland Burke
 Eddie West former Downtown Radio Belfast presenter

See also
 The Radio Nova Story on Radiowaves.fm
 Radio Nova 100FM (Ireland) - Dublin radio station of the same name which began broadcasting in September 2010.
 Irish pirate radio

References

Defunct radio stations in the Republic of Ireland
Pirate radio stations in Ireland
Radio stations established in 1981
Radio stations disestablished in 1986
1981 establishments in Ireland
1986 disestablishments in Ireland
1980s in Ireland